The Men's team time trial of the 2018 UCI Road World Championships was a cycling event that took place on 23 September 2018 in Innsbruck, Austria. It was the 34th edition of the championship, and the 7th since its reintroduction for trade teams in 2012. German team  were the defending champions, having won in 2017. 22 teams and 132 riders entered the competition.

Course
The race consisted of a route  in length, starting from Ötztal and ending in Innsbruck.

Final classification
All twenty-two teams completed the -long course.

References

External links
 Team time trial page at Innsbruck-Tirol 2018 website

Men's team time trial
UCI Road World Championships – Men's team time trial
2018 in men's road cycling